The Commemorative Medal of the Great Serbian Retreat or Commemorative Medal for Loyalty to the Fatherland 1915, better known as the Albanian Commemorative Medal (Serbian: Албанска споменица) was a single-classed military medal awarded to all Serbian military personnel who participated in the Great Serbian Retreat of World War I.

History and criteria
The Albanian Commemorative Medal was instituted on 5 April 1920 by decree of Crown Prince-Regent Alexander I Karadjordjević in the newly established Kingdom of Serbs, Croats and Slovenes until 1929, then by the Kingdom of Yugoslavia.

At the end of 1915, Serbia was invaded by combined Austro-Hungarian, German and Bulgarian armies, the greatly outnumbered Serbian Army, under the command of King Peter and Prince Alexander, faced total destruction but refused to come to terms. The decision was taken to retreat through the mountains of Albania towards the Adriatic coast to Corfu and Greece. During the journey across the mountains around 70,000 soldiers and 140,000 civilians froze, starved to death, died of disease or were killed by hostile Albanian tribes. The reorganised Serbian Army continued fighting the rest of the war on the Macedonian front liberating their country alongside French troops in 1918.

The Commemorative Medal was given on anniversaries and jubilees to all the participants of the event.

Appearance 
The medal was gilt and silvered bronze in appearance, 32.5 mm x 50 mm. the obverse side depicts the profile of the Supreme Commander of the Serbian Army, Prince-Regent Alexander I, surrounding it is the inscription TO MY COMRADES IN ARMS ALEKSANDAR. On the reverse is the inscription FOR LOYALTY TO THE FATHERLAND 1915.

The medal is worn on a light green bar with black stripes along the edge.

The medal was struck by Arthus-Bertrand in Paris.

Notable recipients 
 Momčilo Gavrić
 Sergej Ingr
 Stanislav Krakov
 Milutin Nedić
 Milan Nedić
 Draža Mihailović
 Ilija Trifunović-Birčanin

See also
 Great Retreat (Serbian)

Images

References 

Albanian Commemorative Medal
1920 establishments in Serbia
Orders, decorations, and medals of the Kingdom of Yugoslavia
Awards established in 1920
Military awards and decorations of World War I
Serbia in World War I